Northern Life was a regional news programme on Tyne Tees Television, which aired from 6 September 1976 to 2 October 1992. The programme was aired at 6pm on weekday evenings, for some years at 6.25pm, and ran for 30, 35 or 60 minutes at various points in its run.

The program was the successor to Today at Six, and was replaced by Tyne Tees Today in 1992 following the takeover by Yorkshire Television. The programme had a light-hearted approach and was notable for Paul Frost's monologues towards the end of many editions.

For much of its run, Northern Life had a sub-regional news service integrated into the second part of the programme, with the south of the Tyne Tees region served by the Middlesbrough studio, anchored by Teesside-based news reporters such as Andy Kluz.

Presenters of the show included Bill Steel (the original anchor), Tom Coyne, Paul Frost, Jane Wyatt, Pam Royle, Eileen McCabe, Stuart McNeil and Sheila Matheson.

1976 British television series debuts
1970s British television series
1980s British television series
1992 British television series endings
ITV regional news shows
Mass media in Newcastle upon Tyne
Television series by ITV Studios
Television news in England
Television shows produced by Tyne Tees Television
English-language television shows